Jordan Carrillo Rodríguez (born 30 November 2001) is a Mexican professional footballer who plays as a winger for Spanish Segunda División club Sporting Gijón, on loan from Santos Laguna.

Club career

Santos Laguna
Carrillo made his debut for Santos Laguna on 22 January 2020 against Pumas UNAM in Copa MX. On 25 July 2020, he made his league debut against Cruz Azul.

Sporting Gijón (loan)
On 27 July 2022, Carrillo signed for Spanish club Sporting Gijón for the 2022–23 season.

International career
Carrillo received his first call-up to the senior national team by manager Gerardo Martino, and made his debut on 27 April 2022 in a friendly match against Guatemala, coming in as a substitute in the 72nd minute for Alejandro Zendejas.

Career statistics

Club

International

Honours
Individual
Liga MX Best Rookie: 2021–22

References

External links
 
 
 

Living people
2001 births
Association football midfielders
Santos Laguna footballers
Liga MX players
Footballers from Sinaloa
Sportspeople from Culiacán
Mexican footballers